Jan Gabriël Van der Watt (born 5 November 1952) is one of the world's leading New Testament Scholars and a Bible translator who moved to the Netherlands from Pretoria, South Africa in 2009 to take up a chair in New Testament and Source texts of early Christianity at Radboud University in Nijmegen.  For a quarter of a century previously, he was professor at the University of Pretoria, where he was named as one of the 100 most influential academic thinkers in the 100-year history of the University of Pretoria, South Africa (see www.up.ac.za under Leading Minds). Van der Watt was also rated as international acknowledged researcher that is regarded by some of his international peers as international leader in his field, (see www.nrf.ac.za under rated researchers). Van der Watt is internationally best known for his monograph: Family of the King: Dynamics of Metaphor in the Gosepl According to John.

Biography
He was born on 5 November 1952 in Germiston, South Africa. He obtained more than eight university degrees, all with distinction. He also represented his university in rugby and athletics and received provincial colours for athletics which enabled him to be selected for the South African national competition.

In 2008 he received the University of Pretoria Commemorative Research Medal – Honoring our Leading Minds (1908–2008). This medal is awarded to a select number of researchers (100) in all fields, called "Our (= Univ. of Pretoria) leading minds (1908–2008)", that have played a significant role in establishing the University of Pretoria as a leading research institution over the past 100 years of the history of this institution.

As from 2002 up to now he has been graded as an internationally established and leading researcher in his field by the National Research Foundation of South Africa – no New Testament scholar in South Africa has a higher grading. This indicates unanimous international recognition as well established researcher with significant recognition as world leader in particular field–this rating is done through international peer reviewing). He has successfully supervised 43 PhDs and 84 masters candidates. He is currently the General editor of the Review of Biblical Literature (2005–), a member of the SNTS and an Alexander Von Humboldt Foundation scholar, was a Mercator International scholar at the University of Bonn https://www.uni-bonn.de/the-university. He was also appointed co-chairperson, responsible for the ‘Johannine literature and general epistles’ of the international 30-volume.
 
Prof. Van der Watt places a high premium on scientifically based popular publications, and is renowned both nationally and internationally as religious speaker and writer. He is in fact one of only six religious writers in South Africa to have sold more than a million copies of his Christian books.

 In 1997, and again in 2003, he received the award for best Christian publication for Die Boodskap from the Christian Booksellers of South Africa (CBSA). He was also awarded the sought-after Andrew Murray award in 2000 for Die Bybellenium, and again in 2003 for his role as editor of the impressive Die Bybel A–Z. Another great honour that befell him was being awarded the Totius award by the Suid-Afrikaanse Akademie vir Wetenskap en Kuns in 2006 for his constant outstanding contribution to South African theology.

He lectured for longer periods of time at universities such as the Catholic University of Louvain, Belgium (2002, 2004, 2006), the Mercator University
of Duisburg (Alexander von Humboldt researcher 1990/1991), the Humboldt University of Berlin (Alexander von Humboldt
researcher 2000/2001), and the Rheinische Friedrich-Wilhelm University in Bonn (Mercator International Professor 2006). He also
lectured in the Netherlands at the Catholic University of Utrecht and the University of Utrecht (1999), at the famous Teologische Universiteit Kampen (1995 and 2005). In 2001 he was offered a chair there (an offer that he declined). He appeared as guest professor in South Korea at the Chongshin University in Seoul (2001) and several other Korean universities (2008). He was invited as the Beeson International Scholar to Asbury Theological Seminary
in Kentucky from September to December 2004. In 2008 he was nominated the Alexander von Humboldt professor by the rector
of the University of Mainz, Germany. The goal of this professoriate is to help establish excellence and international acclaim in a given area of research.

He has been married to Shireen (née Crous) for three decades, and they have one daughter (Nireen), a medical doctor.

Publications

Books

Edited by

Journals edited

Academic dissertations
 1978: (A) The use of the term “in Christ” in Colossians. (BD-dissertation–New Testament)
University of Pretoria.
 1979: (A) A semantic discourse analysis of Colossians (MA-dissertation – Greek) University of Pretoria.
 1986: (A) Eternal life in the Gospel according to John (DD-thesis- New Testament) University of Pretoria.
 1999: Dynamics of metaphor in the Gospel according to John (D.Litt.-thesis – Greek), University of Pretoria.

Articles
Through 2009, he has written 52 articles in peer-reviewed journals, and 36 articles in books and collected works. For one of them, the 1999 "Commentary on the Gospel according to John," and "Commentary on Colossians" published in Bybellenium: A one volume commentary, CUM, 1314–1370, 1594–1604" he won the Andrew Murray Prize as well as the South African Booksellers Association prizes for the best Christian publication.

Bible translations
 2002 Die Boodskap–die Bybel in hedendaagse Afrikaans (The Message–the Bible in everyday Afrikaans) (Not to be confused with ‘The Message’). Responsible for translating half of New Testament from Greek, sections of Psalms from Hebrew, and General Co-Editor. Won the South African Booksellers prize for best Christian publication in 2002.
 2003 The Gospel according to Mark. in The multi-translation of the Bible. CUM.
 2003 The Gospel according to John. in The multi-translation of the Bible. CUM.
 2003 The letter to the Colossians. in The multi-translation of the Bible. CUM.
 1999 The New Testament for children in language they could understand – translation of the New Testament Carpe Diem, 591 (together with S. Joubert and H. Stander)
 1999 The Message with Psalms and Proverbs, CUM, 1100 pages. (Not to be confused with ‘The Message’ in English). Over 100,000 in print. Won South African Booksellers Association prize for best Christian publication in 1999.
 2001 The Multi-reference Bible, CUM (editor of New Testament with F. Janse van Rensburg).
 2004 The Multi-translation of the Bible. Co-editor for the New Testament.. CUM. 2004.

References

1952 births
Living people
South African non-fiction writers
Academic staff of the University of Pretoria
University of Pretoria alumni
Academic staff of Radboud University Nijmegen
Academic journal editors
New Testament scholars
South African biblical scholars
21st-century Christian biblical scholars